Karl Helland (born 17 March 1943) is a Norwegian former professional racing cyclist. He won the Norwegian National Road Race Championship in 1966.

References

External links
 

1943 births
Living people
Norwegian male cyclists
Cyclists from Copenhagen